WNEA (1300 kHz) is an AM Christian radio station broadcasting a Christian talk and teaching radio format. It is licensed to Newnan, Georgia, and serves the Atlanta metropolitan area.  The station is owned by Word Christian Broadcasting Inc.  Much of the programming is simulcast with co-owned 1500 WDCY in Douglasville, Georgia and 1500 WDPC in Dallas, Georgia.

WNEA is a Class D radio station.  By day, it transmits with 1,000 watts, but to avoid interfering with other stations on AM 1300, at night it drops its power to 50 watts.  It uses a non-directional antenna.  It originally signed on the air on April 18, 1962.

External links

Radio stations established in 1980
NEA